Admiral Sourendra Nath Kohli, PVSM (21 June 1916 – 21 January 1997) was an Indian Navy admiral who served as the 8th Chief of the Naval Staff from 1 March 1973 until 29 February 1976. Kohli served as the Flag Officer Commanding-in-Chief (FOC-IN-C) of the Western Naval Command during the Indo-Pakistan War of 1971 and successfully led Indian Navy's Western Fleet in Operation Trident and Operation Python against the Pakistan Navy fleet in Karachi.

Early life 
Kohli was the son of B. L. Kohli, and studied BA (Hons.) from St. Stephen's College, Delhi.

Naval career

Early career
Kohli joined the Royal Indian Navy Volunteer Reserve as a cadet in May 1936, immediately after his graduation. He was commissioned as a sub-lieutenant in the RIN on 25 June 1938, with promotion to lieutenant on 1 May 1941.

During World War II, Kohli served in the Persian Gulf and in the Far Eastern theatre. He qualified as a Communication Specialist in the United Kingdom in 1943. He served on board  in 1944-45. He was promoted to acting Lieutenant Commander in 1946 and served at the then RIN Naval Headquarters, HMIS Dalhousie.

Post-Independence
After independence, Kohli opted to join the Indian Navy and was one of the key officers selected to oversee the expansion of the naval fleet.

Other appointments that Kohli held included those as the Senior Officer of the flagship of the Indian Navy, . Later, he also served as the Commanding Officer of the flagship, . He was promoted to substantive commander on 30 June 1951, and was promoted to substantive captain on 30 June 1955.

Kohli served as the superintendent of the Naval Dockyard in Bombay. He also twice served as the Director of Naval Plans. His staff appointments included those as Chief of Material and then as the Vice Chief of Naval Staff.

Flag rank
Kohli rose to flag rank in 1965 with promotion to substantive Rear Admiral on 18 August. He was the Flag Officer Commanding of the Fleet from 1967 to 1969. Kohli was awarded the Param Vishisht Seva Medal in January 1968. He was promoted to Vice Admiral on 14 February 1969. Next, Kohli served as the Commandant of the National Defence College for two years until 1971.

On 12 February 1971, Kohli was appointed the Flag Officer Commanding-in-Chief (FOC-IN-C) of the Western Naval Command. During the war with Pakistan in December 1971, Kohli provided operational leadership for the devastating attacks on Karachi harbour. He also led the defence of Indian Naval facilities on the west coast. He was also responsible for overseeing the safety of the Indian mercantile fleet during the war. He was awarded the Padma Bhushan for his exceptional leadership during the 1971 war.

Chief of Naval Staff
On 1 March 1973, Kohli took over as the Chief of the Naval Staff. He retired from the Navy on 29 February 1976.

Later life
Kohli authored We dared, a memoir of the Indian Navy operations during the war of 1971. He is also the author of Sea Power and the Indian Ocean, an analysis of the geo-political and maritime concerns in the Indian Ocean region.

Personal life 
Kohli was married to the late Sumitra Kohli, and had three daughters.

References

1916 births
Chiefs of the Naval Staff (India)
Vice Chiefs of Naval Staff (India)
Deputy Chiefs of Naval Staff (India)
Indian Navy admirals
Flag Officers Commanding Indian Fleet
Flag Officers Commanding Western Fleet
Commandants of National Defence College, India
Chiefs of Materiel (India)
1997 deaths
Punjabi people
Recipients of the Padma Bhushan in civil service
Royal Indian Navy officers
National Defence College, India alumni